Robert Arcq (1925–1994) was a Belgian writer, working mainly in the Walloon language.  A native of the area around Jumet, he was active in the vicinity of Charleroi. I included in his output are a number of aphorisms and a book of memoirs, published in 1980.

Belgian writers in Walloon
1925 births
1994 deaths
Writers from Charleroi